India competed at the 1992 Summer Olympics in Barcelona, Spain.

Competitors
The following is the list of number of competitors in the Games.

Archery

In India's second appearance in Olympic archery, the nation was represented by three men.

Athletics

Badminton

Boxing

Field Hockey

Team Roster
 (01.) Anjaparavanda Subbaiah (gk)
 (02.) Cheppudira Poonacha
 (03.) Jagdaev Rai
 (04.) Harpeet Singh
 (05.) Sukhjit Singh
 (06.) Shakeel Ahmed
 (07.) Mukesh Kumar
 (08.) Jude Felix
 (09.) Jagbir Singh
 (10.) Dhanraj Pillay
 (11.) Didar Singh
 (12.) Ashish Ballal (gk)
 (13.) Pargat Singh (captain)
 (14.) Ravi Nayakar
 (15.) Darryl d’Souza 
 (16.) Ajit Lakra

Preliminary round

Group A

Classification matches

5–8th place semi-finals

7th Place Game

Judo

Sailing

Shooting

Table Tennis

Tennis

Weightlifting

Wrestling 

4 wrestlers in Men's Freestyle and 2 in Men's Greco Roman has represented India in the 1992 Summer Olympics.

References

Nations at the 1992 Summer Olympics
1992